Richard Lincoln Frey (February 12, 1905 – October 17, 1988) was an American contract bridge player, writer, editor and commentator. From New York City, he died of cancer there in 1988.

An original member of the championship Four Aces team in 1932, Frey left in 1935 to join Ely Culbertson's many bridge enterprises. He was inducted into the ACBL Hall of Fame in 1997.

Bridge accomplishments

Honors

 ACBL Hall of Fame, 1997

Wins

 North American Bridge Championships (6)
 von Zedtwitz Life Master Pairs (1) 1934 
 Vanderbilt (2) 1934, 1942 
 Spingold (1) 1933 
 Masters Team of 4 (1) 1934 
 Spingold (1) 1942

Runners-up

 North American Bridge Championships
 Masters Individual (1) 1931 
 Vanderbilt (3) 1932, 1933, 1944 
 Reisinger (1) 1935

See also
 Four Aces

References

External links
 
 
 

1905 births
1988 deaths
American contract bridge players
American magazine editors
Contract bridge writers
20th-century American non-fiction writers
Journalists from New York City
Card game book writers